Li Na (born May 1, 1984 in Hefei, Anhui) is a Chinese diver who won a gold and silver medal at the 2000 Summer Olympics.

References
 Olympic profile

1984 births
Living people
Divers at the 2000 Summer Olympics
Chinese female divers
Olympic divers of China
Olympic gold medalists for China
Olympic silver medalists for China
People from Hefei
Olympic medalists in diving
Asian Games medalists in diving
Sportspeople from Anhui
Divers at the 2002 Asian Games
Divers at the 1998 Asian Games
Medalists at the 2000 Summer Olympics
Asian Games silver medalists for China
Medalists at the 1998 Asian Games
Medalists at the 2002 Asian Games
Universiade medalists in diving
Universiade gold medalists for China
Medalists at the 2003 Summer Universiade
Medalists at the 2005 Summer Universiade
21st-century Chinese women